"Wet" is the official lead single from hip-hop artist Snoop Dogg's eleventh studio album Doggumentary. The original version was produced by the Cataracs. "Wet" reached number 40 on the Hot R&B/Hip-Hop Songs, number 18 on the Hot Rap Songs and number 13 on the Bubbling Under Hot 100 Singles. A remix of the song entitled "Sweat" was released  by French DJ David Guetta on March 4, 2011.

Background
"Wet" was written by Snoop Dogg along with the Cataracs, who produced the song. Snoop Dogg specifically recorded the song for William, Prince of Wales' (then Prince William of Wales) bachelor party upon the request of the royal family of the United Kingdom and the Commonwealth Realms. Titled "Wet", Snoop spokespeople bill the song as a sequel to 2008's "Sexual Eruption". Produced by the Cataracs, producers of the number-one single "Like a G6", Snoop spoke of the gift: "When I heard the [British] royal family wanted to have me perform in celebration of Prince William's marriage, I knew I had to give them a little something. 'Wet' is the perfect anthem for Prince William or any playa to get the club smokin'." The song was premiered on Snoop's SnoopDogg.com website at precisely 4:20 pm PST, November 30. The official remix, featuring Jim Jones and Shawty Lo, was released on February 8, 2011, as a part of Snoop Dogg's Puff Puff Pass Tuesdays giveaway.

David Guetta remix

The second official remix features production by French DJ David Guetta. This version is entitled "Sweat", and was released on March 4, 2011. The remix interpolates Felix's "Don't You Want Me". A dub remix, which features production by both Guetta and Afrojack, was released on May 13, 2011.

Chart performance
In the United Kingdom, "Sweat" debuted at number 16 on the UK Singles Chart before moving into the top ten of the chart two weeks later, and eventually peaking at number four. The song also hit number one in Belgium for three non-consecutive weeks. Elsewhere, "Wet" also peaked within the top ten of the charts in Finland, Germany and Ireland. On March 14, 2011, "Sweat" debuted on the ARIA Singles Chart at number 60, and the following week it climbed 51 places to number nine. Three weeks later it reached number one for a week, becoming Snoop's third number one single in Australia. It has since been certified 4× platinum with sales exceeding 280,000.

Music video
The video for "Wet" was shot at the Palms Casino in Las Vegas. The video shows scenes including Snoop laying next to several women and walking through a hallway with more women dancing around him. The music video for the song premiered on Snoop Dogg's Vevo account on January 5, 2011. Two edited versions of the video have been released for "Sweat", one of them containing extra scenes featuring Guetta himself.

Track listing
 "Wet" digital download
"Wet" – 3:47

 "Sweat" digital download
"Sweat" (David Guetta Remix) – 3:15

 Digital download E.P.
"Sweat" (David Guetta Remix) – 3:15
"Sweat" (David Guetta Extended Remix) – 5:43
"Sweat" (David Guetta & Afrojack Dub Remix) - 7:30
"Wet" (David Guetta Extended Remix) – 5:42

 German CD single
 "Sweat" (David Guetta Remix) – 3:15
 "Wet" (David Guetta Remix) – 3:16

Credits and personnel

"Sweat"
Songwriting – Calvin Broadus, David Singer-Vine, Niles Hollowell-Dhar, David Guetta, Giorgio Tuinfort, Frédéric Riesterer, Derek Jenkins, Cheri Williams, Dwayne Richardson, Cassio Ware
Vocal recording – Shon Lawon
Production – David Guetta, Giorgio Tuinfort, Fred Riesterer
Mastering – Brian "Big Bass" Gardner

Source:

Charts

Weekly charts

Year-end charts

Certifications

Release history

References

2010 singles
Snoop Dogg songs
David Guetta songs
Songs written by Snoop Dogg
William, Prince of Wales
Catherine, Princess of Wales
British royal family
Music dedicated to nobility or royalty
Number-one singles in Australia
Number-one singles in Austria
Number-one singles in Russia
SNEP Top Singles number-one singles
Ultratop 50 Singles (Wallonia) number-one singles
Song recordings produced by the Cataracs
2010 songs
Songs written by David Singer-Vine
Songs written by Kshmr
Priority Records singles
Song recordings produced by David Guetta